The Bulgarian Hockey League's 1996–97 season was its 45th season, determining the best team at the top level of Bulgarian ice hockey. Five teams competed, with HK Slavia Sofia winning the championship.

Regular season

Playoffs

3rd place
 HK Levski Sofia - Akademik Sofia 3:0 (6:2, 3:2, 8:3)

Final 
 HK Slavia Sofia - HK Metallurg Pernik 3:0 (6:2, 3:1, 5:1)

External links
 Season on hockeyarchives.info

Bulgar
Bulgarian Hockey League seasons
Bulg